Decticryptis is a genus of moths of the family Noctuidae. The genus was erected by George Hampson in 1910.

Species
Decticryptis deleta (Moore, [1885]) Sri Lanka
Decticryptis producta Holloway, 2009 north-eastern Himalaya, Borneo, Bali, Sumbaba, Ambon, New Guinea, Australia
Decticryptis pulchra Holloway, 2009 Borneo

References

Acontiinae